Carnegie Hall is a concert venue in New York City, United States.

Carnegie Hall may also refer to:
 Carnegie Hall, a theatre and concert venue in Dunfermline, Scotland, the town of Andrew Carnegie's birth
 Carnegie Hall (Hubert Laws album), 1973
 Carnegie Hall (Frank Zappa album), 2011
 Carnegie Hall (film), 1947 film directed by Edgar G. Ulmer
 Carnegie Museum of Natural History in Pittsburgh, Pennsylvania that has "Carnegie Hall" as part of its complex
 Carnegie Hall, Inc., a regional cultural center in Lewisburg, West Virginia, United States

See also
 Carnegie Hall Concert (disambiguation)
 Live at Carnegie Hall (disambiguation)
 At Carnegie Hall (disambiguation)